Mary Joe Fernández Godsick (born María José Fernández; August 19, 1971) is an American former professional tennis player, who reached a career-high ranking of world No. 4 in both singles and doubles. In singles, Fernández was the runner-up at the 1990 and 1992 Australian Open, and the 1993 French Open. She also won a bronze medal at the 1992 Summer Olympics. In doubles, she won the 1991 Australian Open with Patty Fendick and the 1996 French Open with Lindsay Davenport, plus two Olympic gold medals.

Career
Fernández first came to the tennis world's attention as an outstanding junior player who won four straight Orange Bowl junior titles. In 1985, aged 14 years and eight days, she became the youngest player to win a main draw match at the US Open when she defeated Sara Gomer in the first round.

Turning professional in 1986, she won her first tour doubles title in 1989 at Dallas, partnering Betsy Nagelsen. She was also semifinalist at the 1989 French Open, losing to Arantxa Sanchez-Vicario 2–6, 2–6.

She reached her first Grand Slam singles final in 1990 at the Australian Open, where she was defeated by Steffi Graf 3–6, 4–6 (having held a 4–1 lead herself in the second set). She won her first WTA Tour singles title the same year at the Tokyo Indoor championships, and finished the year ranked a career-high world No. 4 in singles.

In 1991, Fernández reached the semifinals of the Australian Open, where she was match point up against Monica Seles, before eventually losing 3–6, 6–0, 7–9. She teamed with Patty Fendick to win the women's Australian Open doubles title. At Wimbledon, she reached the semifinals, losing to Steffi Graf in straight sets. 

She reached the Australian Open singles final again in 1992, beating world No. 3, Gabriela Sabatini, in the semifinals before losing to Seles, 2–6, 3–6. She also reached the semifinals of the US Open, beating Sabatini in the quarterfinals and losing once again to Seles. At the 1992 Olympic Games in Barcelona, Fernández was selected to represent the United States and won both a gold medal in women's doubles (with Gigi Fernández) and a bronze medal in singles.

In 1993, she won the title in Indian Wells, defeating Amanda Coetzer in the final. At the French Open, she defeated world No. 5 Sabatini in the quarterfinals and world No. 3 Sanchez-Vicario in the semifinals. In the final against Steffi Graf, Fernandez held several points to lead 3–0 in the final set, but eventually lost 6–4, 2–6, 4–6.

Fernández won her second Grand Slam doubles title in 1996 at the French Open, partnering with Lindsay Davenport. The pair went on to capture the year-end WTA Tour Championships doubles title later that year. 

She was a late replacement for Chanda Rubin on the United States team for the 1996 Olympic Games in Atlanta. She won a second straight women's doubles gold medal, again in partnership with Gigi Fernández. She was also entered in the singles competition (owing to a withdrawal), and reached the semifinals, defeating world No. 2, Conchita Martinez, in the quarterfinals. She was defeated for the bronze medal by Jana Novotná. Later that year, Fernández was a member of the U.S. team that won the Fed Cup. 

Fernández reached the semifinals of the Australian Open in 1997, losing to Martina Hingis 1–6, 3–6. In May, she won her first and only Tier I tournament in Berlin, beating Jana Novotná in the semifinals and Mary Pierce in the final. At the end-of-year WTA Finals, she defeated world No. 2, Lindsay Davenport.

In 1999, she defeated Serena Williams in the third round of the French Open and in her last Grand Slam appearance she lost to Venus Williams in the fourth round of the US Open the same year. 

She retired from the tour in 2000, having won a total of 24 titles:- seven WTA singles titles and 17 doubles titles.

Post retirement
Fernández coached the US Fed Cup team from 2008 to 2016 and served as the woman's coach for the 2012 U.S. Olympic tennis team in London.

She currently works as an analyst and commentator for ESPN.

Personal life
Fernández was born in the Dominican Republic; her parents were immigrants to the country. Her father José is from Asturias, Spain, and her mother Silvia Pino is from Cuba. She completed her high school education at the Carrollton School of the Sacred Heart in Miami, Florida.

In April 2000, Fernández married Anthony (Tony) Godsick, a sports agent with International Management Group. Monica Seles was a bridesmaid at the wedding. They have two children. Her husband is the current agent of Roger Federer. One of their children, Nicholas Godsick, is also a tennis player.

She has homes in Cleveland, Ohio, and Key Biscayne, Florida.

Significant finals

Grand Slam tournaments

Singles: 3 (3 runner-ups)

Doubles: 7 (2 titles, 5 runner-ups)

Olympics

Singles: 1 (bronze medal)

Mary Joe Fernández lost in the semifinals to Steffi Graf, 4–6, 2–6. In 1992, there was no bronze medal play-off match, both beaten semifinal players received bronze medals.

Doubles: 2 (2 gold medals)

Year-end championships

Doubles: 1 title

WTA career finals

Singles: 16 (7–9)

Doubles: 41 (17–24)

Grand Slam performance timelines

Singles

Doubles

References

External links
 
 
 
 Mary-Joe Fernandez ESPN Bio

1971 births
American female tennis players
American people of Asturian descent
American people of Cuban descent
American people of Spanish descent
American sportspeople of Dominican Republic descent
American tennis coaches
Australian Open (tennis) champions
Dominican Republic emigrants to the United States
Dominican Republic people of Spanish descent
French Open champions
Grand Slam (tennis) champions in women's doubles
Hopman Cup competitors
Living people
Medalists at the 1996 Summer Olympics
Medalists at the 1992 Summer Olympics
Olympic bronze medalists for the United States in tennis
Olympic gold medalists for the United States in tennis
People from Key Biscayne, Florida
Schools of the Sacred Heart alumni
Sportspeople from Miami
Tennis commentators
Tennis players from Miami
Tennis players at the 1992 Summer Olympics
Tennis players at the 1996 Summer Olympics
White Dominicans
Women sports announcers
ITF World Champions